Williams Grove Amusement Park is an abandoned amusement park near Mechanicsburg, Pennsylvania. The park operated from 1850 until 2005.

History
The Williams family began hosting picnics in 1850 at a small grove located in the village of Williams Grove outside Mechanicsburg, Pennsylvania. Within a few years, the grove was developed into a park. Two decades later, the park became the Mechanicsburg Fairgrounds.  After World War I, the park's ownership changed several times.  The first rides appeared at the park in 1928.  The adjacent Williams Grove Speedway half-mile track opened in 1938.

Several rides were relocated to Williams Grove from the defunct New Jersey Palisades Amusement Park, which closed in 1971. Williams Grove Park was nearly destroyed mid-year due to Hurricane Agnes, and subsequent flooding from nearby Yellow Breeches Creek. The park was rebuilt and operated through the end of the 2005 season, when the Hughes family focused on the Williams Grove Speedway. Hughes, who was in his mid-80s when the park closed, attempted to sell the property in 2006 to a prospective owner who would keep the park intact and operational, but was unable to find a buyer.  
Several rides were auctioned off that year.  Hughes died in his sleep at his Pennsylvania home on April 12, 2008 at age 88.

Rides 
The Cyclone is a wooden roller coaster and was the main attraction of the park. The Cyclone rises to a height of 65 feet and travels at the top speed of 45 mph. Unfortunately, the Cyclone closed after the 2005 season, leaving it standing but not operational, abandoned and in disrepair with the train parked at the loading station. 

In 2001, the park erected The Wildcat, a Schwarzkopf Wildcat that previously operated at Steel Pier in Atlantic City, New Jersey. Upon the park's closing, the Wildcat was relocated to Adventure Park USA in New Market, Maryland.

Two smaller coasters are the Kiddie Coaster, which had previously operated at Fantasy Farm Amusement Park in Monroe, Ohio, from 1992 until the park's closing, and the Little Dipper, from 1950 until 1963.

The park featured a dark ride called Dante's Inferno, which is still standing, and it used to have a walk-through fun house called Allotria.

In the early 1980s, the park erected one of the first water slides in the area. The slide's platform is still standing abandoned where the two watersides were.

References

External links
Williams Grove Amusement Park at Abandoned

Amusement parks in Pennsylvania
Buildings and structures in Cumberland County, Pennsylvania
Defunct amusement parks in Pennsylvania
1850 establishments in Pennsylvania
2005 disestablishments in Pennsylvania
Modern ruins